The following is a timeline of the history of the city of Tyler, Texas, USA.

19th century

 1846 - Tyler founded as seat of newly created Smith County.
 1848
 William Bartlett elected mayor.
 First Baptist Church founded.
 1850
 Town of Tyler incorporated.
 Population: 1,024 (estimate).
 1851 - Tyler Telegraph newspaper begins publication.
 1863 - Camp Ford Confederate-run prisoner of war camp begins operating near town during the American Civil War.
 1870 - Bonner and Williams Bank in business.
 1871 - Bowdoin Literary Society founded.
 1874 - Houston & Great Northern Railroad begins operating.
 1877 - Tyler Tap Railroad built.
 1882 - "Public school system" organized.
 1888 - Tyler Electric Light and Power Co. in operation.
 1889 - Temple Beth El (synagogue) built.
 1890 - Population: 6,908.
 1894 - Texas College founded.
 
 1895 - Colored Methodist Episcopal church established.
 1898
 Daily Courier newspaper in publication.
 Texas Federation of Women's Literary Clubs conference held in Tyler.
 1900 - Population: 8,069.

20th century

 1904 - Carnegie Public Library of Tyler opens.
 1907 - City of Tyler incorporated.
 1909 - Smith County Courthouse built.
 1910 - Population: 10,400.
 1915 - "Manager-commission form of government" adopted.
 1916 - East Texas Fair begins.
 1918 - Chamber of Commerce incorporated.
 1926 - Tyler Junior College founded.
 1929 - Tyler Morning Telegraph newspaper begins publication.
 1930
 East Texas Oil Field discovered in vicinity of Tyler; oil boom begins.
 Liberty Theatre in business.
 Population: 17,113.
 1931 - KGKB radio begins broadcasting.
 1933 - Texas Rose Festival begins.
 1935 - Bergfeld Park amphitheater built.
 1936 - Tyler Symphony Orchestra established.
 1938 - Tyler City Hall built.
 1940 - Tyler Theater built (approximate date).
 1943 - U.S. military Camp Fannin begins operating near city during World War II.
 1950 - Population: 38,968.
 1952 - Tyler Municipal Rose Garden opens.
 1953 - Caldwell Zoo established.
 1954
 Smith County Courthouse rebuilt.
 KLTV (television) begins broadcasting.
 1955 - Green Acres Baptist Church (later megachurch) established.
 1959 - Smith County Historical Society founded.
 1971 - University of Texas at Tyler established.
 1975 - Broadway Square Mall in business.
 1980 - Population: 70,508.
 1986 - Roman Catholic Diocese of Tyler established.
 1988 - East Texas Islamic Society founded.
 1996 - City website online (approximate date).

21st century

 2005 - Louie Gohmert becomes U.S. representative for Texas's 1st congressional district.
 2007 - Sky Vue Drive-In cinema in business.
 2010 - Population: 96,900.
 2011 - Liberty Hall opens.
 2014 - Martin Heines becomes mayor.
 2016 - Historic preservation city planning begins.

See also
 List of mayors of Tyler, Texas
 Smith County history
 National Register of Historic Places listings in Smith County, Texas

References

Bibliography

<li> 
<li> 
<li> 
<li> 
<li> 
<li> Gladys Peters Austin, Along the Century Trail: Early History of Tyler, Texas (Dallas: Avalon Press, 1946).
<li>  
<li> . 1962- (Index)
<li>  
<li> Donald W. Whisenhunt, comp., Chronological History of Smith County (Tyler, Texas: Smith County Historical Society, 1983). 
<li> 
<li> 
<li>

External links

 
 
 Items related to Tyler, Texas, various dates (via Digital Public Library of America)

Tyler
Tyler, Texas
History of Tyler, Texas